Fernando Arlete II (born 5 November 1979) is a Guinea-Bissauan athlete. He competed for Guinea-Bissau at the 2000 Summer Olympics in the men's 100 metres event but did not finish.

References

External links
 

1979 births
Living people
Bissau-Guinean male sprinters
Olympic athletes of Guinea-Bissau
Athletes (track and field) at the 2000 Summer Olympics